Plast is the largest Scouting organization in Ukraine.

Plast may also refer to:
 Plast (town), a town in Chelyabinsk Oblast, Russia
 Plast (Pláhnetan album), album by the Icelandic band Pláhnetan
 Plast (album), a 1995 album by the Swedish hip hop group Just D

See also
 
 

 Plas (disambiguation)
 Plaster
 Plastic (disambiguation)